Huang Xiaowei may refer to:
 Huang Xiaowei (politician)
 Huang Xiaowei (engineer)